Thank U is the first studio album and Japanese release by the South Korean rock band CNBLUE. The album was released on March 20, 2010 in Japan and the majority of the songs were sung in English with the exception of "voice" and "a.ri.ga.tou." Several of the songs on this album were later released in Korean in the band's debut Korean album, First Step. This album is the first of the two indie albums CNBlue released before signing with Warner Music Japan for their major Japanese debut on October 19, 2011. The album sold over 10,237 copies.

Composition
Several songs were written by leader, lead vocalist, and rhythm guitarist Jung Yong-hwa and lead guitarist and vocalist Lee Jong-hyun. All of the tracks with the exception of "Intro" and "a.ri.ga.tou" were previously released pn their EPs Now or Never and Voice. The Korean versions of "Just Please," "Wanna Be Like U," and "a.ri.ga.tou" were later included in the band's debut Korean album, First Step. "One of a kind" was also included as a bonus track. "a.ri.ga.tou" was changed to the name "Thank You (고마워요; Gomawoyo)."

Track listing

Personnel
Credits adapted from album liner notes.

 CNBLUE:
 Jung Yong-hwa - vocals, guitar
 Lee Jong-hyun - guitar, vocals
 Lee Jung-shin - bass
 Kang Min-hyuk - drums
Instrumental Staff:
OWL - additional instruments
Yoshihiko Chino - all additional instruments and programming, additional guitars
Hirofumi Sasaki - all additional instruments and programming
Hiroyuki Teneda - additional guitars
Choi Yoon-jeong - producing
Shusui (Stock Room International) - sound producing and directing
OWL - directing
Ryo-ta Fukuoka - directing 
Han Seung-hoon - directing
Naoki Ibaraki (Muku Studio) - recording
Yutaka Yamamoto - recording 
Ken Mataucks - recording
Kazuya Kikkai - recording
Lee Yu-jin - recording and mixing
Naoki Ibaraki - mixing 

Choi Hyo-young (Sonic Korea) - mastering
Takshiro Uchida (Flair) - mastering
Technical adviser:
Genpachi Sekiguchi - drums
Hiroyuki Taneda - guitar
Ryo-ta Fukuoka - guitar
Ryota Kanbayashi - bass
Daiki - bass
Sound Crew Studio - recording studio
Muku Studio - recording studio
CtoX Sound Studio - recording studio
F&C Music Studio - recording studio
Seoul Studio - recording studio
Cho Dae-young - art direction & design
Kim Jung-kyeum - photographer
AI Entertainment Inc. - artist promotion
Masahide Asso - artist manager
Yumi Fukuda - label desk
Ayumi Tsuji - label desk
Choi Yoonjeong - executive producer

Chart performance

References

External links
  on Warner Music Japan 

2010 debut albums
CNBLUE albums
FNC Entertainment albums